Mostafa Al-Musawi is a Saudi footballer who currently plays as a forward for Al-Taraji.

References

External links
 

Living people
1995 births
Saudi Arabian footballers
Al-Ahli Saudi FC players
Khaleej FC players
Al Safa FC players
Al-Bukayriyah FC players
Al-Taraji Club players
Saudi Professional League players
Saudi First Division League players
Saudi Second Division players
Association football forwards
Saudi Arabian Shia Muslims